Todor Todorov (born 28 November 1982) is a Bulgarian footballer who plays as a defender.

Honours

Club
 Beroe
Bulgarian Cup:
Winner: 2009-10

References

1982 births
Living people
Bulgarian footballers
First Professional Football League (Bulgaria) players
PFC Beroe Stara Zagora players
Neftochimic Burgas players
Association football defenders
People from Harmanli
Sportspeople from Haskovo Province